Alvi Kola (also Romanized as ‘Alvī Kolā and ‘Olvī Kalā) is a village in Kalej Rural District, in the Central District of Nowshahr County, Mazandaran Province, Iran. At the 2006 census, its population was 1,144, in 313 families.

References 

Populated places in Nowshahr County